Olearia gordonii is a species of flowering plant in the family Asteraceae and is endemic to inland southern Queensland. It is a small, erect, spreading shrub with linear leaves and blue, daisy-like inflorescences.

Description
Its stems and leaves are covered with long, simple and glandular hairs.

Taxonomy
Olearia gordonii was first formally described in 1989 by Nicholas Sèan Lander in the journal Nuytsia from specimens collected on the Thronby Range between Glenmorgan and Surat by David Morrice Gordon. The specific epithet (gordonii) honours the collector of the type specimens.

Distribution and habitat
Olearia gordonii grows in forest dominated by Acacia catenulata between Glenmorgan and Augathella in south-central Queensland.

Conservation status
This daisy bush is listed as of "least concern" under the Queensland Government Nature Conservation Act 1992.

References

gordonii
Flora of Queensland
Plants described in 1989